Pohoy (also Pojoy, Pojoi, Pooy, Posoy, Pujoy) was a chiefdom on the shores of Tampa Bay in present-day Florida in the late sixteenth century and all of the seventeenth century. Following slave-taking raids by people from the Lower Towns of the Muscogee Confederacy (called "Lower Creeks" by the English and Uchise by the Spanish) at the beginning of the eighteenth century, the surviving Pohoy people lived in several locations in peninsular Florida. The Pohoy disappeared from historical accounts after 1739.

Sixteenth century
Tampa Bay was the heart of the Safety Harbor culture area. Ceremonial earthwork mounds were built in the chief towns. Chief towns were occasionally abandoned and new towns built. There are fifteen or more Safety Harbor chief town sites known, most of which are located on a shoreline.

When the Spanish reached Tampa Bay early in the sixteenth century, they found three or four chiefdoms on the shores of the bay. The town of Tocobago was at the northern end of Old Tampa Bay (the northwest arm of Tampa Bay), Uzita controlled the south shore of Tampa Bay, from the Little Manatee River to Sarasota Bay; and Mocoso was on the east side of Tampa Bay, on the Alafia River and, possibly, the Hillsborough River. There may have been a fourth independent chiefdom, Capaloey, on Hillsborough Bay (the northeast arm of Tampa Bay), which may have included the Hillsborough River. Twentieth-century ethnographer Milanich states that the name Pohoy is a form of Capaloey.

The Narváez expedition reached Tampa Bay in 1528. That expedition clashed with the Uzita before departing inland through Tocobago territory. The de Soto expedition landed in Uzita territory in 1539, and then passed through Mocoso territory, and further north along the Withlacoochee River. It noted the inland towns of Guacozo, Luca, Vicela, Tocaste, all of which may have been Safety Harbor culture settlements. Neither expedition seems to have entered Capaloey territory. The Utiza and Mocoso chiefdoms disappeared within 35 years after the encounter with the de Soto expedition, and Tocobago dominated Tampa Bay when Pedro Menéndez de Avilés visited there in 1567.

Seventeenth century
The name Pohoy first appears in historical accounts early in the seventeenth century. In 1608, an alliance of Pohoy and Tocobago may have threatened Potanos who had been converted to Christianity. In 1611 a raiding party from the two chiefdoms killed several Christianized Indians carrying supplies to the Spanish mission (Cofa) at the mouth of the Suwannee River. In 1612, the Spanish launched a punitive expedition down the Suwannee River and along the Gulf coast, attacking Tocobago and Pohoy; they killed many of the native people, including both chiefs. The Spanish of that expedition referred to Tampa Bay as the "Bay of Espiritu Santo and Pojoy", Espiritu Santo being the name Hernando de Soto gave it in 1539. "Bay of Pohoy" or "Bay of Pooy" apparently was applied to the southern part of Tampa Bay. The Tocobago were weakened by the Spanish attack, and the Pohoy became the dominant power in Tampa Bay for a while.

By 1634 Pohoy was allied with or subject to the Calusa chiefdom. (That year the Spanish referred to the "province of Carlos, Posoy, and Matecumbe", i.e., Calusa, Pohoy, and the Florida Keys.) Pohoy and Calusa were described as hostile to the Spanish in 1675. At that time the town of Pohoy was said to be on a river six leagues from Tocobago, perhaps on the Hillsborough River or Alafia River. A Spanish expedition down the coast from the mouth of the Suwannee River in 1680 sought to reach the Calusa domain. The Spanish were warned by the Pohoy chief to turn back. Due to increasingly strident warnings in the next few villages on the way to Calusa, the Spanish did retreat. This expedition described the Pohoy, but not the Calusa, as "docile". A Spanish expedition in 1699 that traveled overland from San Francisco de Potano (near present-day Gainesville) found the Tampa Bay area to be largely deserted. While the Spanish were told that there were many people in villages in the area, they did not see them. The expedition's report mentioned Pohoy several times, but the Spanish apparently did not visit the town.

Alafay people
The Alafay people (also known as Alafaes, Alafaia, and Elafay) were associated with the Pohoy, probably as a sub-group. In the seventeenth century Pohoy territory included the area along what is known as the Alafia River. The Spanish expedition of 1680 reported that Elafay was the next town beyond Pohoy, with 300 people in Pohoy, and 40 in Elafay. The 1699 Spanish expedition reporting passed through an abandoned village named Elafay near Tampa Bay. Don Antonio Pojoi was identified as the leader of the Alafaias Costas nation in 1734.

Eighteenth century
Early in the eighteenth century, Pohoy and Tocobago Indians were living together in a village near the Spanish colonial town of St. Augustine. Alafae people were also recorded as living with other refugee groups here by 1717. Between 1718 and 1723, 162 Alafae were baptized there. In 1718 Pohoy people attacked a village of Tocobago at the mouth of the Wacissa River in the Province of Apalachee. In the 1720s and 1730s, Pojoy Indians were living together with Jororo, Amacapira (possibly related to the Pohoy) and later, Alafae people, in villages south of St. Augustine. Many of the Native American people were reported to have died in an epidemic in 1727, with the survivors leaving the area. A new village of Pohoy, Alfaya and Amacapira, and a neighboring village of Jororo, had been established by 1731. Most of the Pohoy, Alafae, Amacapira and Jororo Indians moved away again in 1734, in response to an attempt by the new governor of Florida to re-settle Indians in villages closer to St. Augustine and extract unpaid labor from them.

By the early eighteenth century, all of the indigenous groups in peninsular Florida were working with and looking to the Spanish authorities for protection from Uchise raiders. (The Uchise were the Muscogee people known as "Lower Creeks" by the British colonists.) The Spanish hoped that the Indians would help protect St. Augustine and Florida from encroachment by British colonists in the Southern Colonies. Nevertheless, in 1738 warfare broke out among several of the groups. In the 1730s the Pohoy held a number of Jororo slaves, and were being paid tribute by the Bomto or Bonito, who had ties to the Mayaca and Jororo. In 1739 the Bomto attacked a camp of the Pohoy and Amacapira, killing more than 20 people. Only one Pohoy man escaped. The Bomto spared the Jororo slaves in the camp. The Pohoy were still allies or subjects of the Calusa, and the Calusa retaliated for the attack on the Pohoy by attacking the Bomto-allied Mayaca people living near Lake Okeechobee. The Spanish received reports that more than 300 people died in that battle. Surviving Pohoy ambushed a Bomto party headed to St. Augustine, killing several. Several of those Pohoy were in turn killed or carried off by Uchise warriors. The Pohoy and Amacapira (and the Bomto) disappeared from history after that.

The Pohoy are one of three mound building tribes from the Tampa Bay area who have been memorialized with a bronze bust installed in the 21st century along the Tampa Riverwalk.

See also
 List of sites and peoples visited by the Hernando de Soto Expedition

Notes

References

 
 

Extinct Native American peoples
Indigenous peoples of the Southeastern Woodlands
Native American tribes in Florida
Native American history of Florida
Former chiefdoms in North America